Black Really Suits You (original title: Le noir (te) vous va si bien) is a 2012 French film written, directed and produced by Jacques Bral.

Plot 
Cobra is the daughter of a Muslim immigrant family in France. Her father Moncef wants to marry her to a Muslim. Her boss is in love with her. She wants to choose herself. One day a friend of her father surprises her in the café where she uses to change her clothes and take off her veil after she leaves home.

Cast 
 Sofia Manousha : Cobra
 Lounès Tazairt : Moncef 
 Julien Baumgartner : Serge
 Grégoire Leprince-Ringuet : Richard 
 Élise Lhomeau : Anaïs 
 Souad Amidou : Maléké 
 Salim Kechiouche : Rachid 
 Thierry Lhermitte : François 
 Sid Ahmed Agoumi : Julien 
 Delphine Rich : Hélène-Laure 
 Magid Bouali : Majid 
 Lisa Makhedjouf : Salima

Accolades

External links 
 
 

2012 films
French drama films
Films scored by Nathaniel Méchaly
French interfaith romance films
2012 drama films
2010s French-language films
2010s French films